Günther, Guenther, Ginther, Gunther, and the variants Günter, Guenter, Guenther, Ginter, and Gunter, are Germanic names derived from Gunthere, Gunthari, composed of  *gunþiz "battle" (Old Norse gunnr) and heri, hari "army". Gunder and Gunnar are the North Germanic equivalents in Scandinavia.

The name may refer to:

People
Günther (given name)
 Günther (singer), the stage persona of Swedish musician Mats Söderlund
Günther (surname)
Gunther, WWE superstar

Places
Gunther Island, in Humboldt Bay, California

Ships
, a number of ships with this name

Fictional characters
 Gunther, a character in the television show Friends
 Gunther, mayor of the city of Motril in the video game Grand Theft Auto V
 Gunther, a character in Kick Buttowski: Suburban Daredevil
 Günther Bachmann, a character in the film A Most Wanted Man
 Gunther Berger, a character in the Luann comic strip
 Gunther Breech, a character in the Canadian animated TV show Jane and the Dragon
 Bernie Gunther, the protagonist of Philip Kerr's Berlin Noir novels
 Welkin Gunther, a character in the video game Valkyria Chronicles
 Gunther Hermann, a character in the video game Deus Ex
 Gunther Hessenheffer, a character from Disney's TV series Shake It Up
 Gunther Thurl, a fictional character in the webcomic Schlock Mercenary
 Gunther Toody, a fictional character in the television show Car 54, Where Are You? (and the film based thereon)
 Gunther, a disguise used by Count Olaf in A Series of Unfortunate Events

Other uses
Gunther Brewing Company, defunct American brewery, which originated as George Gunther, Jr. Brewing Company

See also
Guenther House (disambiguation)
Gunter (disambiguation)
Guntur (disambiguation)

Russian Mennonite surnames